The Torre Europa is a skyscraper built by Necso in the AZCA complex in Madrid, Spain.

History
Completed in 1985, it was designed by Miguel Oriol e Ybarra and built by Necso.

In fiction 

The outdoor scenes of the 2005 film El método were shot by Torre Europa.

References

External links 
 Photos of Torre Europa

Office buildings completed in 1985
Skyscraper office buildings in Madrid
Buildings and structures in Cuatro Caminos neighborhood, Madrid